Valery or Valeri Tretyakov may refer to:
 Valeri Tretyakov (footballer) (born 1945), Russian football coach and player
 Valery Tretyakov (general) (born 1941), Soviet and Russian general